Trans-Mo Airlines was a regional airline and air taxi operator from 1966 until 1983 and based in Jefferson City, Missouri. The airline used Cessna 402 aircraft and published timetables from 1968 to 1983.

Destinations
As of 1979, Trans-Mo served the following destinations:

Jefferson City, Missouri
Kansas City, Missouri
Lake of the Ozarks
Sedalia, Missouri
St. Louis, Missouri

Trans-Mo also served Topeka, Kansas during the late 1960s.

See also 
 List of defunct airlines of the United States

References

Defunct airlines of the United States